Scone Thistle Football Club are a Scottish junior football club based in Scone, Perth and Kinross. Their home ground is Farquharson Park and club colours are black and red.

History
The club was founded in 1882 making it the third oldest football club in Perthshire and oldest Perthshire Junior football club.  They played in the Perthshire Junior leagues up until the outbreak of World War II. In the early 1960s the Jags became members of the Perthshire Juvenile Football Association  (Juvenile football in Scotland was football played by adult players up to the age of 27).

The club were to remain in Juvenile football until 1983 as following the successful winning of the Scottish Juvenile Cup that year the club returned to the ranks of Junior football.

Up until the end of the 2005–06 season, they played in the Tayside Premier League of the Scottish Junior Football Association's Eastern Region where they won the Tayside JFA Division One title in season 1994–95, the East Region Tayside Division One in 2002–03 and the Tayside League Cup in 2005–06.

The SJFA restructured prior to the 2006–07 season, and Thistle found themselves in the twelve-team East Region Premier League. They were relegated to the East Region Central Division.

In April 2012 it was announced that Scone Thistle were returning to the Scottish Junior East Region League after they spent the 2011–12 season in abeyance.

Management
Manager  – Willie Laing
Assistant – Billy Martin
Coach  – Andy McKinnie, Barry MacDonald, Rory Miller, David Rice, Kenny Band
Club physio  – Eric Duff

References

External links
 Scone Thistle F.C. Official Website
 Scone Thistle F.C. Official Twitter Account
 Scone Thistle F.C. Official Matchday coverage Twitter Account

1882 establishments in Scotland
Association football clubs established in 1882
Football clubs in Scotland
Scottish Junior Football Association clubs
Football clubs in Perth and Kinross